CoRoT-13b is a transiting exoplanet found by the CoRoT space telescope on 12 July 2010.

It is an extremely hot Jupiter-like planet with an orbital period of 4.04 earth days, that is around 4257.5 light years away. Its mass is equivalent to 1.308 Jupiter masses, 0.9 Jupiter radii, and has a density of 2.34 g cm 3. CoRoT-13b orbits a G0V star with Te = 5 945K, M = 1.09M, R = 1.01R, solar metallicity. It has a lithium content of +1.45 dex, and an estimated age between 0.12 and 3.15 Gyr. The lithium abundance of the star is consistent with its effective temperature, activity level, and age range derived from the stellar analysis. The planet's density is extreme for its  amount of mass. It implies the existence of an amount of heavy elements with a mass between about 140 and 300M.

References

External links
PlanetQuest Profile
CoRoT-13b in the NASA Exoplanet Archive

Hot Jupiters
Transiting exoplanets
Exoplanets discovered in 2010
13b